No Second Chance is a thriller released in 2003 and is the fifth stand-alone novel written by Harlan Coben. No Second Chance was the first international Book of the Month Club pick in 2003 due to its global appeal.

Plot summary
Dr. Marc Seidman has been shot twice, his wife has been murdered, and his six-month-old daughter has been kidnapped. When he gets the ransom note, he knows he has only one chance to get this right. But there is nowhere he can turn to and no one he can trust.

Serial
The novel was adapted in a movie for TF1 et RTL-TVI in 2015.

References

External links
 Harlan Coben's Website

2003 American novels
Novels by Harlan Coben
American mystery novels
American thriller novels
Dutton Penguin books
American novels adapted into television shows